Shefiu Mohamed (born 20 May 1956) is a Nigerian footballer. He competed in the men's tournament at the 1980 Summer Olympics.

References

External links
 

1956 births
Living people
Nigerian footballers
Nigeria international footballers
Olympic footballers of Nigeria
Footballers at the 1980 Summer Olympics
1980 African Cup of Nations players
Africa Cup of Nations-winning players
Place of birth missing (living people)
Association football forwards